Tubulin, gamma 1 is a protein in humans that is encoded by the TUBG1 gene. This gene encodes a member of the tubulin superfamily. The encoded protein localizes to the centrosome where it binds to microtubules as part of a complex referred to as the gamma-tubulin ring complex. The protein mediates microtubule nucleation and is required for microtubule formation and progression of the cell cycle.

References

Further reading